Lechia is the historical and/or alternative name of Poland.

Current use 
Other uses of the name Lechia are;

In sports:
 Men's football;
 Lechia Gdańsk, Polish football club based in Gdańsk. Formed in 1945.
 Lechia Lwów, the first ever Polish professional football club. Formed in 1903, disbanded in 1939.
 Lechia Zielona Góra, Polish football club based in Zielona Góra. Formed in 1946, disbanded in 2015. Reformed in 2019.
 Lechia Dzierżoniów, Polish football club based in Dzierżoniów. Formed in 1945.
 Lechia 06 Mysłowice, Polish football club based in Mysłowice. Formed in 1906.
 Lechia Kostrzyn, Polish football club based in Kostrzyn. Formed in 1922.
 Lechia Tomaszów Mazowiecki, Polish football club based in Tomaszów Mazowiecki. Formed in 1923.
 Lechia Piechowice, Polish football club based in Piechowice. Formed in 1946.
 Lechia Rokitnica, Polish football club based in Rokitnica. Formed in 1958.
 Olimpia-Lechia Gdańsk, former Polish football club created by a merger between Lechia Gdańsk and Olimpia Poznań. Formed in 1995, disbanded in 1996.
 Lechia-Polonia Gdańsk, former Polish football club created by a merger between Lechia Gdańsk and Polonia Gdańsk. Formed in 1998, disbanded in 2002.

 Women's football;
  Lechia Gdańsk Ladies, Polish football club based in Gdańsk. Formed in 2019.

 Rugby;
 RC Lechia Gdańsk, Polish rugby union club based in Gdańsk. Formed in 1956.

 Athletics;
  KL Lechia Gdańsk, Polish athletics club based in Gdańsk. Formed in 1945.

 Cycling;
  KK Lechia Gdańsk, Polish cycling club based in Gdańsk.

 Sports clubs;
 Lechia Gdańsk (sports club), formed in 1945 it is a Polish multi-sports club based in Gdańsk.
 Lechia Kielce (1920–1948), the first Polish multi-sports club of its name, based in Kielce.
 Lechia Kielce (1955–1988), the second Polish multi-sports club of its name, despite its name it was not associated with the first sports club known as Lechia Kielce.

Animals:
 Lechia (spider) is a genus of jumping spiders (family Salticidae).

Other:
 Lechia is the name of an academic corporation based in Poznań. First formed in 1920 it is mainly used by students from PUEB and UAM.

Former uses 

 Sports
 Biało-Zielone Ladies Gdańsk, is a Polish rugby sevens club based in Gdańsk. Formed in 2009 it was known as “RC Ladies Lechia Gdańsk” from 2009 to 2015.
 AP Orlen Gdańsk, is a Polish footballing academy, most noted for its ladies team, based in Gdańsk. Formed in 2010 it was known as “Akademia Piłkarska Lechia Gdańsk” from 2010 to 2020.
 Other
 Lechia is a name that was often used by a cosmetic company based in Poznań before Nivea took over the factory in 2006.

See also 
 Lech, Czech and Rus, Polish legend 
 Lechitic languages, central Europe